Pocora is a district of the Guácimo canton, in the Limón province of Costa Rica.

History 
Pocora was created on 26 June 1971 by Decreto 1769-G.

Geography 
Pocora has an area of  km² and an elevation of  metres.

Locations
Neighborhoods (Barrios): Pocora Sur
 Villages (Poblados): El Carmen

Demographics 

For the 2011 census, Pocora had a population of  inhabitants.

Transportation

Road transportation 
The district is covered by the following road routes:
 National Route 32

References 

Districts of Limón Province
Populated places in Limón Province